Priyamaana Thozhi is a 2003 Indian Tamil-language drama film written and directed by Vikraman and produced by AVM Productions.  The film stars Madhavan, Jyothika and Sridevi Vijaykumar while Vineeth, Livingston and Manivannan playing other supporting roles. The film's music is composed by S. A. Rajkumar, while S. Saravanan handled the camera. The film opened simultaneously alongside the Telugu version of the film, Vasantham, in July 2003 to an average response critically and commercially. The movie was remade in Kannada in 2010 as Hoo.

Plot
Ashok and Julie have been friends since childhood. They live in Ooty. They don't share any love interest. Ashok falls in love with Nandini, a rich girl whom he marries, and although Julie's closeness to Ashok initially irritates Nandini, she subsequently accepts it. Julie falls in love with Michael D'Souza, a cricketer who's hoping for a place in the Indian cricket team and Ashok happens to be his main rival.

When Ashok gets selected instead of Michael, Michael's father strikes a deal with Ashok that the marriage between his son and Julie will only take place if Ashok steps down and lets Michael substitute him and tells Ashok to cut his friendship with Julie so he doesn't interfere in Michael's and Julie's life, to which Ashok agrees. Ashok acts as an unwilling person to his friend Julie. Julie decides move out of Ashok's house and plans to stay at Michael's. Ashok plans to sell his property and give the money to Julie and to go to Mumbai with Nandini where his friend has offered to arrange him a job. Ashok and his wife vacate their house without informing Julie. Julie and Michael come to know the truth regarding why Ashok is leaving Chennai and they run to the railway station to stop them but fails to find him. To spot Ashok easily, Julie sings a song and which Ashok hears, causing them to reunite. Ashok ends up playing for the Indian team and over the time their children become friends too. The movie ends on a happy note.

Cast

 Madhavan as Ashok
 Jyothika as Nandini Ashok (Voice dubbed by Savitha Reddy)
 Sridevi Vijaykumar as Julie
 Vineeth as Michael D'Souza
 Manivannan as Peter, Julie's father 
 Livingston as Kumar, Ashok's elder brother 
 Ramesh Khanna as "Kaka" Ramesh
 Ramji as Mathi
 R. Sundarrajan as Sundarrajan, Ashok's father 
 Subhalekha Sudhakar as Nandini's father
 Y. Vijaya as Nandini's mother 
 Kumaresan as Ashok's friend
 Nirosha as Ashok's sister-in-law
 Neelu as Ashok's sister-in-law's father 
 Madhan Bob
 Suresh as Ashok's younger brother 
 Tharini as Nandini's elder sister 
 Bharath as Ashok's nephew
 Sweatha Bharathi as Ashok's niece
 Master Sajja Tejja as Young Ashok
 Krishnamachari Srikkanth as himself (special appearance)

Production
AVM Productions had agreed a deal with Vikraman to make a film for them in the 1990s but date clashes meant that they were unable to work together until 2003. Initially titled Inimaiyaana Naatkal before it was retitled, Madhavan signed the film in September 2002, and it became the first time the actor had worked with the producers or the director. Scenes for the film were shot in Ooty, Tamil Nadu with producer Guhan often cooking for the team. The songs were shot abroad, with places filmed where the team filmed including Australia, New Zealand and Switzerland.

The film was also made in Telugu as Vasantham and released on the same date, but with a different cast. Venkatesh, Arthi Agarwal and Kaveri reprised the roles of Madhavan, Jyothika and Sridevi respectively; while V. V. S. Laxman appeared in the film in a cameo instead of Srikkanth.

Release
The film received mixed reviews, with The Hindu's Malathi Rangarajan giving the film an average review concluding that "the dialogue sparkles in many a place, the direction is neat and song sequences have been inserted intelligently — but even with such a youthful team what the film lacks is pep and verve." Another critic noted that the film "has predictable, clichéd situations, stereotyped characters, and lack-lustre treatment. Half-way through the film, you realise which way the script is being steered." Rediff.com noted that " the film lacks the freshness and grandeur of other films", while Sify called it "a highly melodramatic and over-the-top movie with no logic". The critic however noted "If there is something nice about Priyamana Thozhi, it is Sridevi as Julie who looks like a dream, with her controlled and understated performance and steals the show." New Straits Times wrote "wish Vikram had been as meticulous with the storyline and given us something new and more believable".
The actress was also nominated for the Filmfare Best Tamil Supporting Actress Award in 2004 for her performance as Julie.

Priyamaana Thozhi became an average grosser, the first of his career for director Vikraman. He has since struggled to recapture the success that he achieved before this film with his subsequent ventures. The film was remade in Kannada as Hoo with V. Ravichandran.

Soundtrack

The soundtrack of the film was composed by S. A. Rajkumar. The lyrics for the film were written by Pa. Vijay and Kalaikumar. The song "Maankuttiye" was allegedly lifted from Hindi song "Saawan Ka Mahina" from Hindi film Milan (1967). Rajkumar reused "Katre Poongatre" as "Chanda Oh" in Kannada film Mallikarjuna. The song "Rojakkale" was reused from Rajkumar's own Kannada song "O Preethige" which he had composed for Jodi (2001).

References

External links 
 

2003 films
Films about cricket in India
Tamil films remade in other languages
2000s Tamil-language films
Films scored by S. A. Rajkumar
Indian multilingual films
2003 multilingual films